Aupaluk (2021 Population: 233) is a northern village in Nunavik, in the Nord-du-Québec region of Quebec.  It is the least-populous Inuit community in Nunavik.

The name means "where the earth is red", referring to its iron-bearing (ferruginous) soil.

Its population has been increasing: it was 195 in 2011, up from 159 in 2001.

Aupaluk is located on the western shore of Ungava Bay, north of Tasiujaq and 80 km south of Kangirsuk. It is about 150 km northwest of Kuujjuaq.

It is served by nearby Aupaluk Airport.

Since 1996, the Kativik Regional Police Force (KRPF) provides police services for the village.

Demographics 

Education
The Kativik School Board operates the Tarsakallak School. Its building was destroyed in a fire on March 15, 2014.  The school at the time served a total of 54 students.

References

External links
 http://www.nvaupaluk.ca/en/index_eng.htm
 https://web.archive.org/web/20120228015740/http://www.nunavik-tourism.com/Aupaluk.aspx

Inuit communities in Quebec
Road-inaccessible communities of Quebec